Sa'adullah Khan also spelled Sadullah Khan (died April 1656) was a noble of the Mughal Empire who served as the last grand vizier (or Prime Minister) of Emperor Shah Jahan, in the period 1645-1656. He was considered among the four most powerful nobles of the empire during Shah Jahan's time. 

Sa'adullah possessed 7,000 Zat and 7,000 sowar under his command, the highest of any non-royal.

Early life 
Saadullah Khan, or Mulla Saadullah Allami Fahami Lahori, hailed from the area of Chiniot in the Punjab region, born into an "obscure" family of Jat agriculturalists, specifically from the Thaheem Tribe.

Career 
Saadullah Khan was initially made Mir-i Saman in the seventh year of Shah Jahan's reign. He was later recognised as a Mughal noble in 1640-1641, and made a mansabdar. In subsequent years his rank steadily increased, and he received various promotions.

Prime Minister of the Mughal Empire 

In the year 1645, the incumbent Prime Minister Islam Khan II was made to vacate his position and take up governorship in the Deccan region by Shah Jahan. By this time, Saadullah Khan had become widely respected for his intelligence and talent, which had enabled his ascent in the Mughal administration despite a lack of political or family connections. He was appointed as the new Prime Minister.

A year after his appointment, Saadullah Khan handled administrative issues regarding Shah Jahan's Balkh and Badakhshan campaigns. Saadullah Khan was sent to Balkh to manage the country and make the revenue settlements. Prince Murad Baksh was relieved of his command while Vizier Saadullah only took 22 days to settle the administrative affairs and returned to Kabul. He was subsequently rewarded with a Khilat and an increase of 1000 in his mansab for managing the situation efficiently and saving the Mughals from a disaster in Balkh region.

In 1654, he was ordered by Shah Jahan to lay siege to the Chittor Fort in Mewar, in response to provocations from Raj Singh I.

Family 
Saadullah Khan's son Hifzullah Khan remained a prominent noble and governor of Sindh and Kashmir in Aurangzeb's reign. Saadullah Khan was Grandfather of Nizam ul Mulk, the first Nizam and founder of Hyderabad State. Nizam's mother, Wazir un-nissa (Safia Khanum) was the daughter of Sadullah Khan.

Death 
Saadullah Khan served as Prime Minister until his death in April 1656. He was mourned by many in the Mughal court and administration as well as emperor Shah Jahan himself, who issued a public eulogy announcing his demise.

Architecture 
The Jama Masjid of Delhi was built under the supervision of Sa'adullah Khan. Saadullah Khan also built the Shahi Masjid in his hometown of Chiniot.

References 

Mughal nobility
Grand viziers of the Mughal Empire
1656 deaths